Montezuma Well, a detached unit of Montezuma Castle National Monument,  is a natural limestone sinkhole near the town of Lake Montezuma, Arizona, through which some  of water emerge each day from an underground spring.

The "well" measures  in diameter from rim to rim and contains a near-constant volume of spring water even in times of severe drought. The water is highly carbonated and contains high levels of arsenic. At least five endemic species, the most of any spring in the southwestern United States, are found exclusively in Montezuma Well: a diatom, the Montezuma Well springsnail, a water scorpion, the Hyalella montezuma amphipod, and the Motobdella montezuma leech.

Montezuma Well's steady outflow has been used for irrigation since the 8th century. Part of a prehistoric irrigation ditch is preserved near the park's picnic ground, and portions of the ditch's original route are still in use today.

As with Montezuma Castle, the label "Montezuma" is a misnomer: the Aztec emperor Montezuma had no connection to the site or the early indigenous peoples that occupied the area.

Geology

Montezuma Well is geologically very similar to the sinkholes and cenotes found in Florida and the Yucatán peninsula of Mexico, that is, a limestone cave that has collapsed to expose its subterranean water source.

History

Archaeological evidence suggests that humans have lived in the Verde Valley for at least 10,000 years. The earliest signs of permanent settlement in the area appear quite a bit later, however, around 600 CE.

The ruins of several prehistoric dwellings are scattered in and around the rim of the Well. Their inhabitants belonged to several indigenous American cultures that are believed to have occupied the Verde Valley between 700 and 1425 CE, the foremost of which being a cultural group archaeologists have termed the Southern Sinagua. The earliest of the ruins located on the property (with the exception of the irrigation canal), a "pithouse" in the traditional Hohokam style, dates to about 1050 CE. More than 50 countable "rooms" are found inside the park boundaries; it is likely that some were used for purposes other than living space, including food storage and religious ceremonies.

The Sinagua people, and possibly earlier cultures, intensively farmed the land surrounding the Well using its constant outflow as a reliable source of irrigation. Beginning about 700 CE, the Well's natural drainage into the immediately adjacent Wet Beaver Creek was diverted into a man-made canal running parallel to the creek, segments of which still conduct the outflow today. The prehistoric canal, estimated at nearly seven miles in length, likely drained into a network of smaller lateral canals downstream, supplying perhaps as much as 60 acres of farmland with water. The route of the modern canal is partly original, especially close to the outlet, but large portions have been re-routed over time as irrigation needs have changed. Much of the abandoned original route is still visible within the park, however, as the warm water emerging from the Well contains a high concentration of lime, which over many centuries was deposited along the canal walls as the water cooled downstream; the accumulated lime has since hardened into a cement-like coating, preserving the canal's shape.

The existence of the Well was almost unknown to European Americans before the publishing of Handbook to Arizona by Richard J. Hinton in 1878. In 1968, Montezuma Well was the subject of the first ever underwater archaeological survey to take place in a federally managed park, led by archaeologist George R Fischer.

The Yavapai people consider the Well a deeply sacred site, as they believe it is the place through which they emerged into the world.

Ecology

The high concentration of dissolved carbon dioxide gas in the water of the Well – which amounts to more than 80 times the typical freshwater concentration – and to a lesser extent its alkalinity, has prevented the development of any kind of fish population, so the Well remains a fishless spring. However, other types of aquatic life have managed to adapt: at least five endemic species, the most of any spring in the southwestern United States, are found exclusively in Montezuma Well: a diatom, the Montezuma Well springsnail, a water scorpion, the Hyalella montezuma amphipod, and the Motobdella montezuma leech. Many different bird species feed on these organisms and the plant life found in the water.

In recent years Illinois Pondweed (Potamogeton illinoensis) has invaded the Well. Weekly maintenance is required to keep water from the Well flowing through the natural outlet and into the irrigation ditch.

Gallery

See also
 List of sinkholes of the United States

References

External links

Springs of Arizona
Sinkholes of the United States
Archaeological sites in Arizona
History of Yavapai County, Arizona
Bodies of water of Yavapai County, Arizona
Native American history of Arizona
Protected areas of Yavapai County, Arizona
National Park Service areas in Arizona
Sinagua